Original Sin is the twelfth and final studio album by the Australian rock band INXS. It was released on physical media on 16 November 2010 by Epic Records, Atco Records and Polydor after having been released digitally on 28 October 2010. Original Sin features covers of their earlier songs, with each song featuring a guest singer. J.D. Fortune, who was the winner of the Rock Star: INXS competition and featured on the band's previous album Switch, performed lead vocals for the 1990 track "The Stairs", being the last contribution from Fortune before his departure in 2011.

Background
Described as a tribute album by the band members, the record features new recordings of INXS songs. "We've re-invented these songs. Some have been done by an orchestra, some [are] stripped down and some tracks may take you [a while] to recognise what it is," said Jon Farriss.

A review in QRO Magazine gave the album a 5/10 rating. The album charted at number 49 on the Australian Albums Chart.

The album was re-issued in 2011 by Atco Records for the US market. This version features an alternative version of track four "Never Tear Us Apart", the French lyric and vocal duet between Ben Harper and Mylène Farmer is replaced with a solo vocal by Harper.

Track listing

Personnel
Garry Gary Beers – bass
Andrew Farriss – keyboards, guitar, vocals on "Don't Change"
Jon Farriss – drums, percussion, vocals
Tim Farriss – guitar
J.D. Fortune – vocals on "The Stairs"
Kirk Pengilly – guitar, saxophone, vocals

References

2010 albums
INXS albums
Atco Records albums
Polydor Records albums
Epic Records albums
Collaborative albums